Tatung Jamoh is an Indian politician from the state of Arunachal Pradesh.

Jamoh was elected unopposed from Pasighat West seat in the 2014 Arunachal Pradesh Legislative Assembly election, standing as a People's Party of Arunachal candidate. In terms of educational qualification, he is a graduate.

See also
Arunachal Pradesh Legislative Assembly

References

External links
Tatung Jamoh profile
MyNeta Profile
Janpratinidhi Profile 

Living people
People's Party of Arunachal politicians
Arunachal Pradesh MLAs 2014–2019
Arunachal Pradesh MLAs 2019–2024
Year of birth missing (living people)
Indian National Congress politicians from Arunachal Pradesh
Bharatiya Janata Party politicians from Arunachal Pradesh